The Bostancı Ferry Terminal, also known as the  Bostancı İDO Terminal, is a ferry terminal in Bostancı, Kadıköy located on Çetin Emeç Boulevard on the Marmara Sea in Istanbul. İDO operates seabus ferry service from Bostancı to other piers in Istanbul as well as destinations across the Marmara Sea. It is located adjacent to the historic Bostancı Pier, built in 1913.

Connection to IETT city bus service as well as train service from the nearby Bostancı station is available.

Bostancı Terminal opened in 1987 and was one of İDO's first three ferry terminals along with Kabataş and Bakırköy. In the 1990s, İDO expanded their ferry service greatly and ferries operated out of Bostancı to Kartal, Pendik, Yenikapı as well as Marmara and Avşa Island. The terminal itself consists of a terminal building, with six ferry slips and slips for layovers. Inside the terminal building are ticket offices, waiting areas and cafes.

References

Ferry piers in Istanbul
1987 establishments in Turkey
Transport in Kadıköy